Carlos Manuel Guimarães Oliveira Pinto, better known as Carlos Guimarães Pinto (born in Espinho, Portugal, in 1983), is a Portuguese economist, author, university professor, think tank executive, blogger and politician. A prominent member of the Liberal Initiative, on October 13, 2018, he became the president of the party, a position he left on December 8, 2019 being succeeded by João Cotrim de Figueiredo. He is a founder of the think tank +Liberdade, a non-profit institute that promotes democracy, market economy and individual freedom in Portugal. In 2022, he was elected member of the Assembly of the Republic by the Porto electoral district.

See also
Liberalism in Portugal

References

1983 births
Living people
Catholic University of Portugal alumni
University of Porto alumni
21st-century Portuguese economists
Liberal Initiative people